El Fiscal (Spanish "The Prosecutor") is a 2005 novel by R.S. Pratt

It may refer to:
El Fiscal, a 1993 novel by Augusto Roa Bastos
El Fiscal, TV series on Colombia's RCN Televisión 1995–1999

See also
Fiscal (disambiguation)